The March 2009 tornado outbreak sequence was a series of tornado outbreaks which affected large portions of the Central, Southern, and Eastern United States from March 23 to March 29. A total of 56 tornadoes touched down during the event, two of which were rated as EF3.

Meteorological synopsis

An upper trough moved from the Four Corners region into the southern Great Plains and lower Missouri Valley during the day on March 23. During this, a surface low in western portions of Nebraska pushed into eastern South Dakota. A cold front combined with the low moved across the central and southern Great Plains and was the main area where thunderstorm development would occur. Although moisture was limited, strong wind shear created favorable conditions for supercells to develop and rotate. As a result, the supercells had the potential to produce tornadoes. A moderate risk of severe weather was issued for portions of central and eastern Kansas and northern Oklahoma. During the day, a fast-moving supercell produced several tornadoes in eastern Nebraska and across the state line into the west central portion of Iowa. Five tornadoes occurred in eastern Nebraska, with eight people injured in Eagle. In Iowa, an EF2 tornado destroyed one home, damaged another home, a barn and seven outbuildings and derailed 54 empty grain rail cars in Harrison County. The supercell then moved into Montgomery County, where it produced two EF0 tornadoes.

Several days of severe weather began with an EF1 tornado near Meridian, Mississippi on March 25. During the early morning hours of March 26, severe thunderstorms produced six tornadoes in central sections of Mississippi. The most powerful tornado spawned was an EF3 that struck Magee. Sixty homes were either damaged or destroyed with 25 people injured from the tornado. A church was destroyed and a warehouse was severely damaged. An EF2 tornado, three EF1, and an EF0 also occurred as the severe weather moved through the area. A state of emergency was declared for 12 counties by the Governor of Mississippi Haley Barbour. The thunderstorms also produced three tornadoes, one rated EF1 and the other two rated EF0, in southeastern Louisiana and coastal regions of Mississippi. The EF1 tornado damaged seven homes, extensively damaged one trailer and injured one person in Tangipahoa Parish.

Another round of severe weather developed late that evening, producing another intense squall line with embedded tornadoes across the northern Gulf Coast region early on March 27, where several tornadoes were reported. Later during the afternoon, various tornadoes developed in North Carolina, causing structural damage in eastern North Carolina. The tornadoes formed after a disturbance moved into the area from Alabama. One of the tornadoes near Parkton was rated as an EF2 and injured one person.

On March 28, a strong 997 millibar upper-level low pressure area located over Oklahoma was forecast to produce widespread thunderstorms, with a moderate risk of severe weather in most of northern Louisiana, much of Mississippi, and southern Arkansas. A warm front was likely to develop along the leading edge of the system, allowing for atmospheric instability, a necessary component of severe thunderstorms. In areas farther north, relatively cool temperatures were anticipated to limit convective activity but very strong dynamics in the area would allow storms to develop. This would allow a thunderstorm which became separated from the main squall line to become severe and possibly tornadic. Later in the day, the Storm Prediction Center (SPC) issued a slight risk for a large area which encompassed much of the Southeast United States. Tornadic activity was less imminent due to lower due points but strong wind shear was able to provide fuel for severe storms.

More tornadoes occurred on March 28, as they affected Tennessee and Kentucky during the afternoon. A supercell that tracked through three different counties in western areas of Kentucky produced two tornadoes. One of them was an EF3 tornado that destroyed six homes, caused major damage to 10 homes and minor damage to 60 homes and businesses in Corydon. In Tennessee, an EF1 tornado caused damage to several businesses in Murfreesboro, including the local Boys and Girls Club and a shopping plaza, which was heavily damaged. Another EF1 tornado destroyed a modular home and damaged three other homes in Ashland City.

Severe thunderstorms caused widespread damage throughout Pennsylvania on March 29. Thirty barns suffered moderate damage, one barn sustained major damage, six trailer homes were destroyed with two others suffering major damage. Three people were injured by the tornado, which altogether cost an estimated $3 million in damage.

Confirmed tornadoes

March 23 event

March 24 event

March 25–26 event
This event covers through the morning of March 26, which was due to a continuous bow echo/line.

March 26–27 event
This event covers through the morning of March 27, which was due to a continuous bow echo/line.

March 27 event
This event covers activity in the afternoon and evening of March 27.

March 28 event

March 29 event

Corydon, Kentucky

Surface heating throughout the day destabilized the atmosphere ahead of a cold front in the Tennessee and Ohio Valleys. At 2:20 pm CST, the Storm Prediction Center in Norman, Oklahoma issued a tornado watch for western Kentucky, central Tennessee, and northern Alabama. Not long after, supercell thunderstorms began to develop over southern Illinois, producing hail up to 1 inch in diameter. By 4:00 pm CST, a supercell thunderstorm developed in western Kentucky, near the border with Illinois, and a severe thunderstorm warning was issued for the storm. Shortly after, a tornado warning was issued around 4:30 pm CST for Union County, Kentucky as doppler radar images depicted rotation in the thunderstorm. Around 4:43 pm CST, a tornado touched down about 5 miles south-southwest of Waverly, Kentucky and tracked towards the northeast along Kentucky Route 141. Not long after the tornado touched down, it crossed into Henderson County. At 4:48 pm CST, the tornado intensified into an EF3 and passed directly over the town of Corydon. After causing severe damage in Corydon, the tornado continued towards the northeast before dissipating south of the Henderson County Airport around 5:00 pm. The tornado was on the ground for roughly 12 miles over a 17-minute span.

Although four tornado sirens failed to sound when the tornado warning was issued for Corydon, no fatalities were reported as a result of the tornado. About 70 structures were damaged and six were destroyed by the tornado and two people were injured. One of the injuries was caused after a man was struck by a television which was thrown by the tornado. Numerous residents were caught off guard by the tornado, with some people remaining outside after the warning was issued. Concrete and brick structures collapsed, mobile homes were destroyed with debris wrapped around trees, and power lines were downed throughout the area. One truck was picked up by the tornado and thrown about 0.25 miles. An oil well also leaked into a creek as a result of the tornado. Most homes in the town of 780 people were left without power. Damages from the tornado amounted to $540,000.

Aftermath
A state of emergency was declared for Henderson County on March 30, two days after the tornado hit Corydon. The following day, Red Cross workers arrived in the town and set up their operations center in the Old Corydon School; however, not many people went to the center to receive aid.

Siren malfunction
Following the impact of the EF3 tornado, emergency management officials discovered that four of the ten sirens which were supposed to go off when the tornado warning was issued for Henderson County did not function. Emergency management personnel worked to replace the batteries in all ten sirens in the days after the tornado but lacked the supplies to complete this. Since the battery replacement was not completed, two more sirens failed on April 2 when a possible tornado touched down in the same area. After the April 2 event, the repair of the tornado sirens was completed and they were all working.

Non-tornadic events

March 23 Iowa squall line
Ahead of the developing low pressure area, a squall line of thunderstorms developed along a low-level jet stream. The line was first noted around 3:35 am CDT in Cass County, Iowa where  winds were recorded at the Atlantic Municipal Airport. Later that day, a much stronger line of severe thunderstorms developed in Plymouth County. In Cherokee County, a semi-truck was blown over by high winds.

See also
 List of North American tornadoes and tornado outbreaks

References

External links
Summary of the tornado from the NWS in Paducah, Kentucky

Tornadoes of 2009
F3 tornadoes
Tornadoes in Oklahoma
Tornadoes in Arkansas
Tornadoes in Tennessee
Tornadoes in Louisiana
Tornadoes in Georgia (U.S. state)
Tornadoes in South Carolina
Tornadoes in North Carolina
Tornadoes in Alabama
Tornadoes in Pennsylvania
Tornadoes in Mississippi
Tornadoes in Kentucky
Tornadoes in Kansas
Tornadoes in Iowa
Tornadoes in Nebraska
Tornadoes in South Dakota
March 2009 events in the United States